"AM" is a song by Puerto Rican singer Nio García and Puerto Rican producer Flow La Movie which was originally released on January 28, 2021, through the Flow La Movie label. An official remix with Colombian singer J Balvin and Puerto Rican rapper Bad Bunny was made available worldwide on June 24, 2021 as a standalone single. José Álvaro Osorio Balvín wrote both the original version and its remix version with the production of the two versions by the writer credited as Flow La Movie.

Background
Nio García talks about on how the remix version of "AM" featuring J Balvin and Bad Bunny was conceived which hit the charts moderately.

García spoke in an interview regarding the story behind the remix version of the track:

"I have an exquisite and marvelous team. I always try to create a cool ambiance,” Nio Garcia told Billboard during a Live Q&A on Instagram. “We created many songs at the same time but I focused on this one because I knew it was going to be a hit."

Produced by Flow La Movie, Xound, Botlok and Yama, “AM” marked the first single released by García of 2021. It’s a saucy reggaeton track that cleverly counts from one to 12 to describe everything he wants to do to a girl.

Commercial performance
The remix version of "AM" was a commercial success as it charted at number 6 in Spain and stayed there for 32 weeks. Also, it charted at number 41, 4, 6, 13, 22, 20, and 21 on the Billboard Hot 100, Hot Latin Songs, Argentina Hot 100, Bolivia, Colombia, Ecuador and Peru, respectively.

Music video
The music video for remix of "AM" was released on July 9, 2021 on Mora's YouTube channel.

Charts

Weekly charts

Year-end charts

Certifications

Release history

References

External links
 

2021 singles
2021 songs
Bad Bunny songs
Songs written by J Balvin
Songs written by Bad Bunny